Barbara Allen (born February 8, 1961) is a Republican, Kansas state senator from the 8th District. She is from Overland Park, Kansas, and is an attorney. Allen graduated with a Bachelor of Science from Mount Vernon College for Women (now the George Washington University Mount Vernon campus) and a degree from the University of Missouri–Kansas City Law School. She was first appointed to the Kansas House of Representatives to fill the remainder of the term of Ron Fox, who resigned in 1987, and won re-election in her own right for an additional six terms. In the 2000 election, she won a seat in the Kansas Senate, where she served for two terms.

In March 2005, Allen was informed that she had breast cancer. Unable to be treated in Kansas, Allen sought treatment at the Dana–Farber Cancer Institute in Boston. After, twelve rounds of chemotherapy, thirty-three radiation treatments, and surgery, doctors said that they could not detect any cancer.

She is a patron of the Kansas Children's Cabinet.

Personal life
Allen is a native of Overland Park, Kansas. She married Kevin Moriarty in November 2011.

Political experience
Senator, Kansas State Senate, 2001–2008
Representative, Kansas State House, 1989–2001
Assistant Attorney General, 1985–1987

References

External links
 

University of Missouri–Kansas City alumni
Place of birth missing (living people)
Living people
Women state legislators in Kansas
Mount Vernon Seminary and College alumni
20th-century American politicians
20th-century American women politicians
Politicians from Overland Park, Kansas
21st-century American women politicians
21st-century American politicians
Republican Party Kansas state senators
Republican Party members of the Kansas House of Representatives
1961 births